Antonis Xylouris (born September 6, 1937), nicknamed Psarantonis, is a Greek composer, singer and performer of lyra, the bowed string instrument of Crete and most popular surviving form of the medieval Byzantine lyra.

Biography
Psarantonis comes from the mountainous village of Anogeia in Crete which during World War II was destroyed by the German occupying forces, when he was just two years old. Psarantonis is the younger brother of the late Nikos Xylouris, a notable Cretan singer/musician as well as the older brother of Yiannis Xylouris, an equally notable Cretan musician. Psarantonis is also the father of Cretan musician George Xylouris.

Psarantonis is known for the special timbre of his voice and his lyra playing style. Apart from the lyra Psarantonis plays various traditional instruments. He first played the lyre at the age of 13 and recorded his first single in 1964, titled "I Thought of Denying You". He has released many recordings since then and has represented Greece many times in festivals abroad.

In May 2005, Psarantonis performed at the World Music Institute's 20th anniversary benefit concert at Town Hall, New York. In 2007 at the festival Rock "All tomorrow's Parties" in Minehead, UK. In January 2009, he gave memorable performances in the rock music festival All Tomorrow's Parties hosted in Brisbane, Sydney and Mount Buller (in Victoria) and curated by Nick Cave & The Bad Seeds.
In 2007 he worked with Daemonia Nymphe on their album Krataia Asterope doing the vocals and playing the lyra in the track Dios Astrapaiou

He has also worked with Italian singer and songwriter Vinicio Capossela, similarly to his son Labis.

Discography

1973: Κρητική Ξαστερία
1976: Η Μάχη της Κρήτης
1976: Πηγές
1978: Σαϊτέματα
1982: Αναστορήματα
1983: Οι ρίζες μου
1985: Εκτός Εαυτού
1986: Να κάμω θέλω ταραχή
1989: Τα μεράκια του Ψαραντώνη
1990: Από φλόγες η Κρήτη ζωσμένη
1991: 30 Χρόνια Ψαραντώνης
1991: Μαθήματα Πατριδογνωσίας
1991: Ο γιος του Ψηλορείτη – Son of Psiloritis
1994: Παλιό κρασί 'ναι η σκέψη μου – My thoughts are like old wine
1995: Μουσική Ανοιξη
1996: Από Καρδιάς – De Profundis
1997: Cretan Music – The way of Psarantonis
1998: Νογώ – I reckon reflexions
1999: Ιδαίον Άνδρον -Idaion Antron
2000: Τέσσερις Δρόμοι για τον Ερωτόκριτο
2000: Λεόντιος Μαχαιράς – Χρονικό της Κύπρου (Μουσική Ψαραντώνης)
2000: Χαϊνιδες – Ο Ξυπόλυτος Πρίγκιπας
2001: Νίκος Κυπουργος -Τα Μυστικά του Κήπου
2002: Ριζίτικα – Rizitika
2002: Παπά-Στεφανής ο Νίκας-Αγρίμι και Κοράσο
2007: Ψαραντωνης & Βασίλης Σκουλάς – Άνθη του Χρόνου
2007: Να 'χεν η Θάλασσα βουνά – Had the Sea mountains
2008 :Σαν Πυροβατης
2008: Αντάρτες των βουνών – Mountain rebels
2009: Εκειά που θέλω

See also

 Byzantine Lyra
 Cretan Lyra
 Music of Crete

References

External links
 Official Web site of Psarantonis

Cretan musicians
1942 births
Living people
Greek songwriters
People from Anogeia